Delaware, Lackawanna & Western Railroad Station, or variations, may refer to:

in the United States
(by state)
 Delaware Lackawanna and Western Railroad Station (Morristown, New Jersey), listed on the NRHP in New Jersey
 Hoboken Terminal, listed on the NRHP in New Jersey
 Delaware, Lackawanna and Western Railroad Station (Boonton, New Jersey), listed on the NRHP in New Jersey
 Delaware, Lackawanna and Western Railroad Station (Dover, New Jersey), listed on the NRHP in New Jersey
 Delaware, Lackawanna & Western Railroad Station (Leicester, New York), listed on the NRHP in New York
 Delaware, Lackawanna & Western Railroad Station (Painted Post, New York), listed on the NRHP in New York
 Delaware, Lackawanna and Western Railroad Station (Scranton, Pennsylvania), listed on the NRHP in Pennsylvania